Melba J. Curls (born October 3, 1941) is a former American Democrat politician who served in the Missouri House of Representatives.  She was married to former Missouri state senator Phil Curls.

Born in Kansas City, Kansas, she formerly served on the board of the National Kidney Foundation.  Curls also attended the University of Missouri.

References

1941 births
Living people
20th-century American politicians
21st-century American politicians
Democratic Party members of the Missouri House of Representatives
20th-century American women politicians
21st-century American women politicians
Politicians from Kansas City, Kansas
Women state legislators in Missouri
University of Missouri alumni